Shelia Burrell (born 15 January 1972 in Albuquerque, New Mexico) is a retired American heptathlete. She was a two-time representative of the United States at the Summer Olympics, competing in 2000 and 2004. Her best Olympic finish was fourth place. She also competed twice at the World Championships in Athletics, which included a bronze medal in 2001. She was also a two-time silver medalist at the 1999 Pan American Games. Her personal best for the heptathlon 6472 points and she was American national champion on four occasions.

On the professional circuit, she was the winner of the 2002 Hypo-Meeting, having previously finished fourth at the 1999 Hypo-Meeting and the 2000 Hypo-Meeting. In her last outing there, she was sixth at the 2004 Hypo-Meeting. In 2001, she won the Décastar in France.

She completed a major in English and American studies at UCLA and was coached by Bob Kersee while there, and later by Jane Frederick. After her college career she was coached by Cliff Rovelto. She is not related to namesakes, contemporaries and fellow African-Americans track athletes Leroy Burrell and Dawn Burrell.

International competitions

National titles
USA Outdoor Track and Field Championships
Heptathlon: 1999, 2002, 2003
United States Olympic Trials
Heptathlon: 2004

Personal bests
200 metres – 22.92 (2001)
800 metres – 2:10.29 (2000)
100 metres hurdles – 13.05 (2001)
High jump –  (1999)
Long jump –  (2002)
Shot put –  (2002)
Javelin throw –  (2000)
Heptathlon – 6472 pts (2001)

References



1972 births
Living people
Track and field athletes from Albuquerque, New Mexico
American heptathletes
African-American female track and field athletes
Olympic track and field athletes of the United States
Athletes (track and field) at the 2000 Summer Olympics
Athletes (track and field) at the 2004 Summer Olympics
Pan American Games medalists in athletics (track and field)
Athletes (track and field) at the 1999 Pan American Games
World Athletics Championships athletes for the United States
World Athletics Championships medalists
UCLA Bruins women's track and field athletes
Pan American Games silver medalists for the United States
Competitors at the 1998 Goodwill Games
Medalists at the 1999 Pan American Games
21st-century African-American sportspeople
21st-century African-American women
20th-century African-American sportspeople
20th-century African-American women
20th-century African-American people